"Death and the Maiden" is a song by New Zealand rock band The Verlaines, who are one of a number of 1980s bands signed to Flying Nun Records and attributed to the Dunedin Sound. It was released as a single in 1983 and is arguably the most popular song in their discography.
The 'B' side of the record was "CD, Jimmy Jazz & Me."

"Death and the Maiden" later appeared on the 1987 album Juvenilia, which was a collection of The Verlaines' early singles and EPs.

New Zealand rock band Elemeno P released a cover version of this song on their 2005 album Trouble in Paradise. Former Pavement frontman Stephen Malkmus also recorded a version for the Flying Nun Records tribute album Under the Influence - 21 Years of Flying Nun Records in 2002. Boston band Prickly covered the song on their 1997 LP Velleity.

Meaning of the lyrics

You'll only end up like RimbaudGet shot by Verlaine, Verlaine, Verlaine, Verlaine....
The lyrics above refer to Paul Verlaine, a 19th-century French poet. After going into a drunken rage, Verlaine shot his lover – fellow poet Arthur Rimbaud in July 1873.  The Verlaines took their name from the French poet.

Shall we have our photo taken?We'll look like Death and the Maiden 
This is a reference to a painting of the same name by Egon Schiele, which shows a woman embracing a skeleton. The image is reproduced on the label of Verlaines' side of the "Dunedin Double" EP, issued in 1982 which is the year before the release of "Death and the Maiden".

In the media
Featured in New Zealand movie Scarfies and on its soundtrack release.

1983 songs
The Verlaines songs
Flying Nun Records singles
Death in music